This article lists notable people of the Indian surname Patel.

Politics
Abdul Qadir Patel, Pakistani politician
A. D. Patel, Fijian politician
Adam Patel, Baron Patel of Blackburn, member of the House of Lords of the United Kingdom
Ahmed Patel, Indian politician 
Anandiben Patel, Chief Minister of Gujarat (2014–2016)
Anupriya Patel, Indian Politician
Babubhai Patel (politician), Bharatiya Janata Party politician
Babubhai Jashbhai Patel, Chief Minister of Gujarat (1975–1976, 1977–1980)
Bhupendrabhai R. Patel, Chief Minister of Gujarat (2021–)
Chimanbhai Patel, Chief Minister of Gujarat (1973–1974, 1990–1994)
Dahyabhai Patel, Indian freedom fighter, politician
Dinsha Patel, Indian politician
Dipak Patel (politician), Zambian politician
Eboo Patel, American political consultant
Haribhai M. Patel, Indian politician
Harilal Madhavjibhai Patel, Indian politician
Jayadevappa Halappa Patel, former Chief Minister of Karnataka
Kamlesh Patel, Baron Patel of Bradford, British politician
Kanjibhai Patel, Indian politician
Kash Patel, American attorney and former government official
Keshubhai Patel, Chief Minister of Gujarat (1995, 1998–2001)
Kishanbhai Vestabhai Patel, Indian politician
Lilian Patel, Malawian politician
Navin Patel, Fiji-Indian politician
Nitin Patel, Deputy Chief Minister of Gujarat (2016–2021)
Pasha Patel, Indian politician
Patel Dahyabhai Vallabhbhai, Indian politician
Praful Patel, Indian politician
Priti Patel, British politician, former Home Secretary
Qadir Patel, Pakistani politician, currently member of National assembly
R. D. Patel, Indo-Fijian lawyer
R. K. Singh Patel, agriculturist and politician
Ramaben Patel (born 1953), lawyer and politician from Gujarat
S. B. Patel, Indian politician
Somabhai Gandalal Koli Patel, Indian politician
Sone Lal Patel, Indian politician
Tribhuvandas Kishibhai Patel, man behind the Milk Movement (Amul) of India
Vallabhbhai Patel (1875–1950), Indian politician, first Deputy Prime Minister of India (1947–1950)
Vinod Patel, Fiji-Indian politician
Vinubhai Patel, Fiji-Indian politician
Vithalbhai Patel, Indian politician
Juned Patel , Indian Politician
Ibrahim Ali Patel , Indian Politician

Arts
Alpesh Patel, American film director
Amisha Patel, Bollywood actress
Anuradha Patel, Indian actress
Ashmit Patel, Bollywood actor
Dev Patel, British actor
Devang Patel, Indian singer
Gayatri Patel, Bollywood actress
Gieve Patel, Indian poet
Harish Patel, Indian actor
Kumar Patel, Fictional film character
Himesh Patel, British actor
Ishu Patel, Indian animated film director
Karan Patel, Indian actor
Neil Patel, American scenic designer
Nikki Patel, British actress
Pannalal Patel, Indian writer
Punam Patel, American actress
Ravi Patel, American actor
Ravji Patel, Indian poet and novelist
Rihaan Patel, Indian film director
Rupal Patel, Indian actress
Sameer Iqbal Patel, Indian actor
Sonia Patel, Indian-American psychologist and author
Upen Patel, Bollywood actor

Sports
Aditya Patel, Indian professional racing driver
Akhil Patel, English cricketer
Akshar Patel, Indian cricketer
Ashish Patel, Canadian cricketer
Ashok Patel, Indian cricketer
Ashok Sitaram Patel, Kenyan cricketer
Axar Patel, Indian cricketer
Brijal Patel, Kenyan cricketer
Brijesh Patel, Indian cricketer
C. D. Patel, Tanzanian cricketer
Chetan Patel, English cricketer
Dinesh Patel, American baseball player
Dipak Patel (cricketer, born 1958), New Zealand cricketer
Dipak Patel (cricketer, born 1961), Indian cricketer
Jasu Patel, Indian cricketer
Jeetan Patel, New Zealand cricketer
Jitendra Patel, Canadian cricketer
Jyotsna Patel, Indian cricketer
Kalpesh Patel (Indian cricketer), Indian cricketer
Kalpesh Patel, Kenyan cricketer
Kirti Patel, Indian cricketer
Malhar Patel, Kenyan cricketer
Min Patel, Indian cricketer
Mitesh Patel, Indian hockey player
Mohan Patel, New Zealand hockey player
Munaf Patel, Indian Cricketer
Nandikishore Patel, Ugandan cricketer
Niraj Patel, Indian cricketer
Parag Patel, English shooter
Paresh Patel, New Zealand hockey player
Parthiv Patel, Indian cricketer
R. D. Patel (cricketer), Tanzanian cricketer
Rakep Patel, Kenyan cricketer
Rakesh Patel, Indian cricketer
Ramesh Patel, New Zealand hockey player
Rashid Patel, Indian Cricketer
Rita Patel, Indian cricketer
Sameer Patel, English cricketer
Samit Patel, English cricketer

Others
Amit Patel, American surgeon
Anushka Patel, Australian scientist and cardiologist
Apoorva D. Patel, hue physicist
Baburao Patel, Indian publisher, writer
Chai Patel, British doctor and businessman
Chandrakant T. Patel, Indian scientist
Dorab Patel, Pakistani judge, activist
Framjee Nasarwanjee Patel, Indian merchant, philanthropist
Harilal Manilal Patel, Fiji Indian lawyer
I. G. Patel, Indian economist
Karsanbhai Patel, Indian industrialist
Kevin Patel, an American climate activist
Kiran C. Patel, Indian-American surgeon and philanthropist
Kumar Patel, American Inventor
Maniben Patel, Indian freedom fighter
Narendra Patel, Baron Patel, Tanzanian obstetrician
Nikesh "Nik" Patel, Indian American businessman
Nilay Patel, American technology journalist
Nisha Patel, British police officer
Pankaj Patel, Indian entrepreneur
Raj Patel, British Indian writer
Ramanbhai Patel, Indian chemist
Rupal Patel (scientist), speech scientist working in USA
Satyam Patel, Indian social activist
Shakil Patel, Indian American architect
Sheela Patel, Indian activist
Shiv Kumar Patel, Indian outlaw
Tejas Patel, Indian cardiologist
Trupti Patel, British pharmacist
Urjit Patel, Governor of RBI
V. G. Patel, Indian author, economist
Vimla L. Patel, Canadian psychologist
Viraf Patel, Indian model

See also
Meet the Patels
Patil (surname)

Lists of people by surname
Surnames